This is a list of newspapers in Montana.
Current news publications
 Anaconda Leader - Anaconda
 Belgrade News - Belgrade
 Big Horn County News - Hardin
 The Big Sky Weekly - Big Sky
 The Big Timber Pioneer - Big Timber
 Bigfork Eagle - Bigfork
 Billings Gazette - Billings
 Billings Outpost - Billings
 Billings Times - Billings
 The Bitterroot Star - Stevensville
 Blackfoot Valley Dispatch - Lincoln
 Blaine County Journal News-Opinion - Chinook
 Boulder Monitor - Boulder
 Bozeman Daily Chronicle - Bozeman
 Bridger Times - Bridger
 Carbon County News - Red Lodge
 Cascade Courier - Cascade
 Char-Koosta News - Pablo
 Choteau Acantha - Choteau
 Circle Banner - Circle
 Clark Fork Valley Press - Plains
 Cut Bank Pioneer Press - Cut Bank
 Daily Inter Lake - Kalispell
 Daniels County Leader - Scobey
 Dillon Tribune - Dillon
 The Ekalaka Eagle - Ekalaka
 The Exponent - Bozeman
 Fairfield Sun Times - Fairfield
 Fallon County Times - Baker
 Flathead Beacon - Kalispell
 Glacier-Reporter - Browning
 Glasgow Courier - Glasgow
 Glendive Ranger-Review - Glendive
 Great Falls Tribune - Great Falls
 Havre Daily News - Havre
 The Herald-News - Wolf Point
 Hungry Horse News - Columbia Falls
 The Independent-Observer - Conrad
 Independent Press - Forsyth
 Independent Record - Helena
 Jordan Tribune - Jordan
 Judith Basin Press - Stanford
 Kootenai Valley Record - Libby
 Lake County Leader - Polson
 Laurel Outlook - Laurel
 Lewistown News-Argus - Lewistown
 Liberty County Times - Chester
 Livingston Enterprise - Livingston
 The Local Rag - Red Lodge
 Lone Peak Lookout - Big Sky
 The Madisonian - Ennis
 Meagher County News - White Sulphur Springs
 Miles City Star - Miles City
 Mineral Independent - Plains
 The Missoula Independent - Missoula
 Missoulian - Missoula
 The Montana Catholic - Helena
 Montana Free Press - Helena
 Montana Kaimin - Missoula
 Montana Standard - Butte
 The Montanian - Libby
 The Mountaineer - Big Sandy
 Phillips County News - Malta
 The Philipsburg Mail - Philipsburg
 Powder River Examiner - Broadus
 Ravalli Republic - Hamilton
 The River Press - Fort Benton
 The Roundup - Sidney
 Roundup Record-Tribune - Roundup
 Sanders County Ledger - Thompson Falls
 The Searchlight - Culbertson
 Seeley Swan Pathfinder - Seeley Lake
 Shelby Promoter - Shelby
 Sheridan County News - Plentywood
 Sidney Herald - Sidney
 Silver State Post - Deer Lodge
 Stillwater County News - Columbus
 Terry Tribune - Terry
 Three Forks Herald - Three Forks
 The Times-Clarion - Harlowton
 Tobacco Valley News - Eureka
 Townsend Star - Townsend
 The Valierian - Valier
 Valley Journal - Ronan
 West Shore News - Bigfork
 West Yellowstone News - West Yellowstone
 The Western News - Libby
 Whitefish Pilot - Whitefish
 Whitehall Ledger - Whitehall
 The Wibaux Pioneer-Gazette - Wibaux
 Yellowstone County News - Huntley

See also
List of newspapers
List of newspapers in the United States
List of African-American newspapers in Montana
List of defunct newspapers of the United States
List of newspapers in the United States by circulation

References

Montana
Newspapers